Harris Mundon Mosdell (1883–1944) was a journalist, physician and political figure in Newfoundland. He represented Fortune Bay and then Fortune Bay and Hermitage in the Newfoundland and Labrador House of Assembly from 1926 to 1934 as a Liberal and then Independent member.

He was born in Bay Roberts, the son of Thomas Mosdell, and was educated there and at the University of Toronto. Mosdell taught school for several years before purchasing a printing plant and establishing a newspaper, the Outlook, in Bay Roberts. He moved Toronto in 1909 where he became a reporter and also studied medicine. After receiving a Bachelor of Medicine, he returned to Newfoundland in 1911 and began the practice of medicine at Woody Point. He became the editor of the Fishermen's Protective Union newspapers, the Fisherman's Advocate and the Daily Mail in 1914, later becoming editor of the Liberal Daily Star. Mosdell was named to the Legislative Council of Newfoundland in 1922. He resigned from the council in 1926 to run in a by-election for a seat in the Newfoundland assembly. He served in the Executive Council as a minister without portfolio. In 1930, he received an M.D. In 1934, he was named secretary in the Department of Public Health and Welfare. Mosdell married Bessie Mundy.

References 
 

Members of the Newfoundland and Labrador House of Assembly
1883 births
1944 deaths
University of Toronto alumni
Members of the Legislative Council of Newfoundland
Government ministers of the Dominion of Newfoundland
People from Bay Roberts
Dominion of Newfoundland expatriates in Canada